Sandhaanu (meaning Throne in English) was an online political news magazine in the Maldives. It was launched in 1999. Its main editor Ahmed Didi together with his main contributors Ibrahim Lutfy and Mohamed Zaki were sentenced to life in prison while another editor (Fathimath Nisreen) to 10 years in prison in 2003 for their criticism of President Maumoon Abdul Gayoom and his government. One of their contributors (Ibrahim Lutfy) managed to escape from prison and went under the protection of the Swiss government. The others remained in prison and suffered torture and isolation constantly before being released due to the threat of economical sanctions by the European Union against the Maldivian Government. Hence, as a show of cooperation to the EU, the Maldives Government released the remaining editors one by one erasing all criminal charges brought against them.

At the end of 2006, they started an online version of their news magazine which has gained popularity among Maldivians living abroad. By 2007 they had started the production of their own weekly magazine which was mostly is seen as a magazine opposed to Gayoom's Government. When Gayoom was ousted from power Sandhaanu became a pro-government magazine focusing on various areas of concern in the country. However, it was closed in 2008.

References

External links
Editors of an electronic newsletter sentenced to life in prison
BBC News: Maldives leader frees dissidents
Sandhaanu Maldivian News Media

Defunct political magazines
Magazines established in 1999
Magazines disestablished in 2008
Mass media in the Maldives
News magazines published in Asia
Online magazines